The American Dream is Emitt Rhodes' first album. It was recorded from 1967 to 1969, but released in 1970 as a contractual obligation to A&M Records. The album was reissued in 1971 in response to the success of his self-titled debut album on Dunhill Records.

Track listing
All songs by Emitt Rhodes

 "Mother Earth" – 2:29
 "Pardon Me" – 2:46
 "Textile Factory" – 3:04
 "Someone Died" – 2:04
 "Come Ride, Come Ride" – 2:53
 "Let's All Sing" – 2:41
 "Holly Park" – 2:59
 "You're a Very Lovely Woman" – 2:52
 "Mary Will You Take My Hand" – 2:21
 "The Man He Was" - 2:59
 "In the Days of the Old" – 2:13
 "'Til the Day After" – 2:46

NOTE:  "Saturday Night" – 1:59 was on the short-lived original release in 1970, but was deleted in favor of "You're a Very Lovely Woman" on the more well-known re-release in 1971.  "Saturday Night" does appear on Listen, Listen — the Definitive Collection of The Merry-Go-Round & "The Emitt Rhodes Recordings (1969–1973)".

Personnel
Emitt Rhodes — vocals, multi-instruments
Don Randi - keyboards
Pete Jolly - drums
Lyle Ritz - bass
Jim Gordon - drums
Hal Blaine - drums
Chuck Berghofer - bass, drums
Perry Botkin, Jr. - arranger
John Guerin - drums
Gary Kato - drums
Larry Knechtel - keyboards
Joel Larson - drums
James Leitch
Drake Levin
Donald Peake - guitar
Joe Porcaro - percussion
Emil Radocchia
Bill Rheinhart
Michael Rice
Ian Freebairn-Smith - arranger
David Bennett Cohen - guitar
Tom Reynolds
Jim McCrary - photography

References
 Emitt Rhodes: Recorded at Home, by Kevin Ryan, Tape Op #33, Jan. 2003, pp 44–50.

American Dream, The
American Dream, The
Albums arranged by Perry Botkin Jr.
A&M Records albums